Broadway Rastus may refer to:

Broadway Rastus (revue), a theatrical show by Irvin Miller
Pseudonym used by Frank Melrose